Top Station is a tourist destination located in Theni district of Tamil nadu. Top Station is notable as the historic transshipment location for Kannan Devan tea delivered there from Munnar and Madupatty by railway and then down by ropeway to Kottagudi. This area is popular for the rare Neelakurinji flowers.  The Kurinjimala Sanctuary is nearby.  Top Station is the western entrance to the planned Palani Hills National Park.

History

Top Station was a transshipment point for delivery of tea from Munnar to Bodinayakkanur. Top Station derived its name from its being the upper terminus of the Kottagudi Aerial Ropeway. It was also the location of the terminal railway station on the Kundala Valley Railway, built in 1902 between Munnar, Kundalai and this low point in the crest of the hills above steep cliffs. A monorail goods carriage system was initially installed along this cart route. In 1908 the monorail was replaced by a 24 inch gauge railway. Some remains of Kundala Valley Railway can be seen at the Munnar Tea Museum.

Tea chests arriving at Top Station from the Kundalai Valley were transported by a ropeway from Top Station 5 km downhill to the south to Kurangani, Tamil Nadu. The tea was then shipped 15 km by cart to Bodinayakkanur, then by rail to other places in India and by ship to England. Remains of the ropeway station at Top Station are still visible.

Geography

Top Station offers a panoramic view of the majestic Western Ghats and the valley of Theni district.

References

External links

Geography of Idukki district
Hills of Kerala
Aerial lifts
Vertical transport devices
Hills of Tamil Nadu
Tourist attractions in Idukki district